Sirmand (also Romanized as Sīrmand; also known as Qal‘eh-ye Sarmad, Sarmahd, and Sīmand) is a village in Ashkara Rural District, Fareghan District, Hajjiabad County, Hormozgan Province, Iran. At the 2006 census, its population was 665, in 168 families.

References 

Populated places in Hajjiabad County